was a Japanese daimyō of the Sengoku period, who was a traditional authority in the north half of Dewa Province and the south half of Yezo island. Kiyosue was the son of Andō Hirosue.

Kiyosue mediated the Ainu dispute with the Japanese who followed for about 100 years, and had their trade agreements concluded.

References

1514 births
1553 deaths
Andō clan
Daimyo
People from Akita Prefecture